NFPA 805: Performance-Based Standard for Fire Protection for Light Water Reactor Electric Generating Plants was introduced in 2001 by the National Fire Protection Association to provide a performance based standard for fire protection in light water nuclear reactor electric generating plants.

There are currently four editions with a fifth planned for release in 2020. The editions are as follows 2001, 2006, 2010, 2015, 2020(current), 2025(future).

NFPA 805, 2001 edition, meets the Alternate Fire protection rule from the U.S. Nuclear Regulatory Commission 10 CFR 50.48(c).

References

External links
NFPA 805
10 CFR 50.48(c)

2001 introductions
Fire protection
NFPA Standards